Autoroute 540 is a short spur highway, connecting Route 138 to Autoroute 73 and linking the Jean Lesage International Airport with the Pierre Laporte Bridge. It is also known as Autoroute Duplessis, honouring former Premier Maurice Duplessis.

Exit list
Exit numbers on Autoroute 540 are numbered from north to south, unlike other Autoroutes which are numbered from south to north.

References

External links

Transport Quebec website
Transports Quebec Map 
A-540 at Quebec Autoroutes
A-540 at motorways-exits.com

40-5 (Quebec City)
Streets in Quebec City